Elaeocarpus sylvestris, the woodland elaeocarpus, is a tree species in the genus Elaeocarpus.

Distribution 
The woodland elaeocarpus is found in China (Fujian, Guangdong, Guangxi, Guizhou, Hainan, Hunan, Jiangxi, Sichuan, Yunnan, Zhejiang), Japan, Korea, Taiwan and Vietnam (Indochina).

Description 
The tree is up to 15 m and is found in evergreen forests at altitudes comprised between 300 and 2000 m. The evergreen shiny leaves are oblanceolate. The greeny-white flowers are grouped in racemes and are followed by black olive-like fruit in autumn.

Uses 
The fruits of the woodland elaeocarpus are edible. The oil from the seeds may be processed into soap or lubricants. The bark may be used as a source for dye. The wood does not resist water, so it is not considered good timber, but it is used for growing shiitake mushrooms.

It is also planted along streets and in parks.

Ecology 
The larvae of the moth Leucoblepsis excisa feed on the leaves of E.  sylvestris. In urban forests of Kamakura, Kanagawa, Japan, the Formosan squirrel (Callosciurus erythraeus taiwanensis) is a pest to the tree because of its gnawing habit.

Woodland elaeocarpus in susceptible to Elaeocarpus yellows, a disease discovered in 1999 and a type of Phytoplasma disease, which causes a chlorosis (Japanese: 萎黄病 io-byo) of the plant. Oxytetracycline has been used to fight the pathogen.

Chemistry 
This species contains the gallotannin 1,2,3,4,6-penta-O-galloyl-beta-D-glucose, a compound that may be used in radioprotection. It also contains elaeocarpusin, a molecule with a unique acid ester group probably derived by a condensation of a hexahydroxydiphenoyl group and dehydroascorbic acid attached to the 2,4-positions of 1-O-galloyl- 3,6-(R)-hexahydroxydiphenoyl-D-glucopyranose (corilagin).

Symbolism 
The horutonoki (Elaeocarpus sylvestris var. ellipticus) is the tree symbol of Japanese city Urasoe, Okinawa. Wild Dampalsu trees (Elaeocarpus sylvestris var. ellipticus) in Cheonjiyeon Waterfall are South Korean Natural Monument no. 163.

Gallery

See also 
 Liothrips horutonoki, a thrips species in the genus Liothrips

References

External links 

 Elaeocarpus sylvestris at efloras.org
 Elaeocarpus sylvestris at en.hortipedia.com

sylvestris
Trees of China
Trees of Japan
Trees of Korea
Trees of Taiwan
Trees of Vietnam
Plants described in 1811